Jaap Paauwe (3 February 1909 – 25 June 1982) was a Dutch footballer. He played in eight matches for the Netherlands national football team from 1931 to 1932.

References

External links
 

1909 births
1982 deaths
Dutch footballers
Netherlands international footballers
Place of birth missing
Association footballers not categorized by position